Gyalideopsis vainioi is a species of lichen in the family Gomphillaceae. It was described as new to science in 1988 by Klaus Kalb and Antonín Vězda from Brazilian collections. The variety Gyalideopsis vainioi var. semicirculata  was published in 2007; it was found in Florida. The specific epithet honours Finnish lichenologist Edvard Vainio, known for his pioneering work with Brazilian lichens.

References

External links
Pictures of Tropical Lichens - photograph

Ostropales
Lichen species
Lichens described in 1988
Lichens of Brazil
Lichens of the Southeastern United States
Taxa named by Antonín Vězda
Taxa named by Klaus Kalb
Fungi without expected TNC conservation status